Systematic Reviews is an online-only open access peer-reviewed medical journal published by BioMed Central that focuses on systematic reviews. Articles are either about specific systematic reviews, reporting their protocols, methodologies, findings, follow-up, etc., or else they are about such reviews as a class, discussing the science of systematic reviews.

The three editors-in-chief laid out their approach in the journal's first article.

Abstracting and indexing 
The journal is abstracted and indexed in Embase, Index Medicus/MEDLINE/PubMed, and Scopus.

References

External links 
 

BioMed Central academic journals
Review journals
General medical journals
Publications established in 2012
English-language journals
Creative Commons Attribution-licensed journals